McWaters is a surname. Notable people with the surname include:

Alfred McWaters, Australian mayor
Jeff McWaters (born 1956), American politician
William McWaters ( 1844–1875), American outlaw